Artigues is a commune in the Aude department in the Occitanie region of southern France.

The inhabitants of the commune are known as Artiguais or Artiguaises.

Geography

Artigues is located some 10 km south by south-east of Quillan and 2 km west of Axat. Access to the commune is by the D83 road from Axat in the east passing through the village and continuing west then south by a tortuous route to Le Clat. The commune is rugged and heavily forested but with a little farming activity near the village.

The river Aude forms the south-eastern border of the commune as it flows north. The Ruisseau de l'Esteille rises in the south of the commune and flows east to join the Aude east of the commune. The Ruisseau de la Fage rises in the south of the commune and flows north to join the Ruisseau d'Artigues just south of the village which flows east to join the Aude.

Neighbouring communes and villages

Heraldry

Administration

List of Successive Mayors

Demography
In 2017 the commune had 73 inhabitants.

Sites and monuments

The Church of Saint-Nicolas (1830);
The Gorge of Saint-Georges, with cliffs 300m high;
The Col du Garabeil.

Church Picture Gallery

See also
Communes of the Aude department

References

External links
Artigues on Géoportail, National Geographic Institute (IGN) website 
Arugues on the 1750 Cassini Map

Communes of Aude